Boyang is a town in southwestern Guangdong province, People's Republic of China, located near the border with Guangxi. It is under the administration of Huazhou City.

Towns in Guangdong